Trend Weekly, (閒情報) is a Chinese language ethnic weekly newspaper based out of Calgary, Alberta. It was founded in 2001 to serve the growing Chinese population in Western Canada.

Trend Weekly is owned by Trend Media Inc. (Calgary, Alberta), parent company of another weekly Chinese newspaper, Oriental Weekly (東方報). Its publisher is Danny Chan, 30+ years veteran of Chinese publishing in Canada.

Trend Weekly is available every Thursday from authorized vendors, free of charge. Its key contents include lifestyle news, consumer trends and local community news.

See also
List of newspapers in Canada

References

External links
Official website
Chinese-Canadian culture in Alberta
Chinese-language newspapers published in Canada
Newspapers published in Calgary
Weekly newspapers published in Alberta